NeXTstation is a high-end workstation computer developed, manufactured and sold by NeXT from 1990 until 1993. It runs the NeXTSTEP operating system.

Overview
Several models were produced, including the NeXTstation (25 MHz), NeXTstation Turbo (33 MHz), NeXTstation Color (25 MHz) and NeXTstation Turbo Color (33 MHz). In total, NeXT sold about 50,000 computers (not including sales to government organizations), making the NeXTstation a rarity today.

The NeXTstation originally shipped with a NeXT MegaPixel Display 17" monitor (with built-in speakers), keyboard, and mouse. It is nicknamed "the slab", since the pizza box form factor contrasts quite sharply with the original NeXT Computer's basic shape (otherwise known as "the cube").

The Pyro accelerator board increases the speed of a NeXTstation by replacing the standard 25 MHz processor with a 50 MHz one. There was also a very rare accelerator board known as the Nitro; between 5 and 20 are estimated to have been made. It increased the speed of a NeXTstation Turbo by replacing the standard 33 MHz processor with a 40 MHz one.

Specifications 
 CPU: Motorola 68040, 25 MHz or 33 MHz (Turbo)
 Memory: 8 MB (12 MB for NeXTstation Color, 16 MB for NeXTstation Turbo Color)
 NeXTstation: Eight 30-pin SIMM slots (up to 32 MB)
 NeXTstation Color: Eight 72-pin SIMM slots (up to 32 MB)
 NeXTstation Turbo/Turbo Color: Four 72-pin SIMM slots (up to 128 MB)
 Display resolution: 1120 × 832 px
 Color Depth: 
 NeXTstation/Turbo (256 KB VRAM): 4 colors (black, white and two shades of gray)
 NeXTstation Color/Turbo Color (1.5 MB VRAM): 4,096 colors (12-bit)
 Digital signal processor: Motorola 56001 @ 25 MHz (16-bit, 44.1 kHz, stereo, 24 KB RAM, upgradable to 576 KB)
 Speaker built into the monitor
 Input/Output:
 Floppy internal connector
 SCSI internal connector
 SCSI-2 external connector (MD50)
 DSP port (DA-15)
 NeXTstation/Turbo: MegaPixel Display port (DB-19)
 NeXTstation Color/Turbo Color: Display port (13W3)
 Proprietary NeXT Laser Printer port (DE-9)
 Two RS-423 serial ports (Mini-DIN 8)
 10BASE-T and 10BASE-2 Ethernet
 Media: 3.5 in 2.88 MB floppy disk drive
 Storage: hard disk from 105 MB, 250 MB, 340 MB, 400 MB to 4 GB (Larger sizes may work but the OS cannot use partitions larger than 4 GB)
 Operating System: NeXTSTEP, OPENSTEP. NetBSD supports some of the NeXTstation's hardware.
 Peripherals: 
 Modem
 Keyboard: Full-stroke mechanical (85 keys)
 Mouse: 2 button opto-mechanical
 Size/Weight: 39.8 (W) × 36.5 (D) × 6.4 (H) cm /

See also
 Previous, emulator of NeXT hardware
 NeXT Computer
 NeXTcube
 NeXTcube Turbo
 NeXT character set

References

External links 

 old-computers.com — NeXTstation
 NeXTstation brochure
 NeXTComputers.org
 ifixit NeXTstation Teardown

Computer workstations
NeXT
68k-based computers